Belgrave is a town and outer suburb in Melbourne, Victoria, Australia, 36 km east of Melbourne's central business district, located within the Shire of Yarra Ranges local government area. Belgrave recorded a population of 3,894 at the 2021 census.

History 

Belgrave is situated in the foothills of the Dandenong Ranges, part of the land of the Wurundjeri first nations people.  Belgrave was first settled by Europeans in 1851.

Belgrave was named after an 1840s chapel in Leeds, Yorkshire, England; the name was carried by Mr and Mrs R.G. Benson when they came to Melbourne in 1856. Their sons, the Benson Brothers, settled in the Belgrave district in the 1870s. Though originally the area was known as "Monbulk" for the reservoir that lay near by, the town wasn't known as Belgrave until around 1903, and another suggested name for the town at that stage was Glassford. A Post Office opened in the area around 1904. Many men from Belgrave went to the two world wars, and there is a war memorial in Belgrave.

McDonald's rejection 
In 1993, the Shire of Sherbrooke prepared a site specific amendment for land adjoining the Belgrave roundabout to facilitate the development of a 70-seat McDonald's restaurant including drive-through. The proposal was unpopular attracting many objections from within the local community. The Panel approved the proposal but disallowed the drive-through. McDonald's decided not to proceed with the development. Application for a nearly identical proposal by the site owner was approved by Yarra Ranges Council in 1996 but lost on appeal at the Victorian Administrative Appeals Tribunal.

Business 

Most of the commercial district of Belgrave is located on Main Street, which is at the end of Burwood Highway. There are also shops on Bayview Road, which is located just across the rail bridge.
Belgrave has galleries and bookshops. There is an organic and fair trade emphasis amongst some businesses including Belgrave Organics, a number of cafés serving fairtrade coffee (Earthly Pleasures Organic Café, The Laughing Owl, Mareesa's Cafe, Tree of Delights and Bensons). There is Belgrave Emporium with stalls of new and vintage wares, works from local artists plus vintage clothing and items. There is a Woolworths supermarket, two hairdressing salons, a travel agency, a building design (drafting) service, a pharmacy, a butcher, a dry cleaner, a bakery, a patisserie “ The Blacksmith" a newsagency, a cinema, a few fast food outlets, restaurants, a Centrelink office, a pub and a few bars/lounges, two banks (the Commonwealth Bank and the Bendigo Bank), a tattoo studio, as well as a public library. It also has a very active Traders Association.

Tourism 

Belgrave's most notable attraction is the heritage narrow gauge, steam-operated Puffing Billy Railway, which was reopened in 1962—after four years of restoration by volunteers—and travels through 24 kilometres of cool temperate rainforest, semi-urban development and rural farmland to Gembrook. It is also the terminus of the Belgrave Suburban Electric Railway Line.

Other nearby attractions include The 1000 Steps in Upper Ferntree Gully, Sherbrooke Forest and Sherbrooke Falls in the Dandenong Ranges National Park.

Social scene 

Belgrave has a park 3 km from the Main Street.

The Cameo Cinema has eight cinemas, with Cinema 1 dating to the 1930s. There is an outdoor Cinema at the rear of the building, which is open only during the summer months (December to March). There is a music scene with live acts taking place at Sooki Lounge, 12 Bar Belgrave, Zuke's Place, and Belgrave Hotel. There is a recording studio. The historic property known as Glen Harrow Gardens has been featured on travel television programs. During the summer months, Belgrave Pool is open. Belgrave pool is an outdoor 33m heated pool.

Special events 
Belgrave has a growing reputation for popular, and innovative cultural events. Belgrave Survival Day is an annual event held on 26 January (Australia Day) and presents an opportunity for people in the area to honour and celebrate Indigenous and Torres Strait Islander peoples, their continuing culture and heritage.

The Lantern Parade, coinciding with the winter solstice, brings together the community of the Hills in a celebration of friendship, light, warmth and creativity. The street is reclaimed for the people engaging in one of the best and biggest community-made spectacles as hundreds of lanterns line the main street, accompanied by drummers, dancers and performers of all sorts.

Schools 

Belgrave itself does not contain any state schools, with these being located in the neighbouring suburbs of Tecoma, Selby and Belgrave South. Upwey High School is the nearest state high school.

Two Catholic schools operate within Belgrave: St Thomas More's Primary School that was founded in 1963 by the parish of Belgrave, and is situated on Reynolds hill overlooking Belgrave and adjacent to St. Thomas More's Catholic Church, and Mater Christi College, a girls' secondary school located on Bayview Road.

Recreation and government buildings 

Belgrave has a police station, which acts as the base for all police stations in the Dandenong Ranges Region. There is also the Belgrave Volunteer Fire Brigade on Bayview Road, which has been serving the community for over 80 years. It is also home to the Dandenong Ranges Fire Brigades Group HQ, from there, the CFA and Parks Victoria used to manage all major fires within the Dandenong Ranges, though this has moved to an Incident Control Centre in Ferntree Gully since the Black Saturday Fires of 2009. There is also an Ambulance station in Bayview Road.

There is a Centrelink office on the high side of Main Street. The State Member for the seat of Monbulk, James Merlino MLA, has his Electoral Office in Belgrave. The closest Shire of Yarra Ranges office is in Upwey on Main Street.

The Belgrave Town Park, just below the police station, provides a fine view over the town as well as a public space for events such as the annual Christmas carols. Just off the Belgrave-Hallam Road is the Belgrave outdoor swimming pool, tennis courts and a playground.

The town supports both a cricket and Australian Rules football team which are located at Belgrave Recreation Reserve on Reserve Road. It is also the home ground of the Belgrave Junior Football Club.  The Belgrave Cricket Club is affiliated with the Ferntree Gully And District Cricket Association, while the Belgrave Football Club competes in the Yarra Valley Mountain Football League.

Transport 
Belgrave railway station is located behind the main street shops, with the steam train Puffing Billy just beyond it. Belgrave suburban electric trains go to Melbourne via Ringwood. Puffing Billy goes to Gembrook.

Bus services are located throughout the suburb, and go to Oakleigh, Lilydale, Gembrook, Olinda, Belgrave South, Upwey.

Major roads include Burwood Highway, Wellington Road, Ferntree Gully Road and Belgrave-Hallam Road, all providing access to the city centre of Melbourne.

Public reserves
Public reserves in Belgrave include Belgrave Lake Park, Belgrave Recreation Reserve, Borthwick Park, Violet Larsen Reserve and Dandenong Ranges National Park.

Belgrave Lake Park

Biodiversity
A small reserve surrounding Belgrave Lake and located south of Belgrave town centre. It is an important biolink between Dandenong Ranges National Park and Birdsland as well as Lysterfield Lake Park. The park has a combined focus of recreation and conservation. Monbulk creek flows through the area and is important for wildlife such as platypus and water rat. In the trees, arboreal mammals include the sugar glider and also would have been a habitat for the yellow-bellied glider. The reserve is dominated by Eucalyptus cypellocarpa (mountain grey gum) on the slopes. Along the riparian zone (adjacent to creek) the dominant plant species are Eucalyptus viminalis subsp. viminalis (manna gum), Acacia dealbata (silver wattle).

History
Belgrave Lake was constructed in 1893 to supply water to Dandenong. Water flowed by pipeline to Heany Park in Rowville and then by aqueduct and pipeline through Churchill Park and on to Dandenong. From 1924 water supply to Dandenong was discontinued but the pipeline continued to supply water to farms in the Lysterfield area. Fern Tree Gully Shire leased the pipeline from 1940 to 1950. The pipeline was still in use in the 1970s and was closed some time after that.

Media 
Belgrave's local newspapers are The Free Press Leader, and The Ferntree Gully-Belgrave Mail and its local radio station is 3MDR on 97.1FM.

Gallery

See also
 Belgrave railway line
 Belgrave Lantern Festival
 Puffing Billy Railway
 Belgrave (Puffing Billy) railway station

References

External links 

 Belgrave - Official government tourism site.
 Belgrave Township—Belgrave Traders Association
 Eastern Dandenong Ranges
 3MDR 97.1FM
 Mater Christi College
 St Thomas More Primary School
 Menzies Creek Primary School
 Sherbrooke Community School
 Belgrave Cricket Club
 Belgrave Football Club
 Belgrave Junior Football Club

Suburbs of Melbourne
Suburbs of Yarra Ranges